Pavao Pavličić (born 16 August 1946, in Vukovar) is a Croatian writer, literary historian and translator whose main focus are crime novels. He writes for both adults and children.

Pavao Pavličić was born on August 16, 1946 in Vukovar, where he completed elementary school and high school. In 1969, he graduated from the Faculty of Philosophy of Zagreb University with a degree in comparative literature and the Italian language, and in 1974 he received his doctorate with a thesis in the field of metrics (Rhyme sisters in Croatian literature: literary-theoretical and literary-historical aspects). 

Since 1997, Pavličić is a full member of the Croatian Academy of Sciences and Arts.

In 2014 he won the Zvane Črnja Award for his Narodno veselje..

References

External links

1946 births
Living people
Croatian novelists
Male novelists
Croatian essayists
Croatian male writers
Male essayists
Croatian translators
Crime fiction writers
Members of the Croatian Academy of Sciences and Arts
People from Vukovar
Faculty of Humanities and Social Sciences, University of Zagreb alumni
Academic staff of the University of Zagreb
Croatian screenwriters
Translators from Italian